Braden Schneider (born September 20, 2001) is a Canadian professional ice hockey defenceman for the New York Rangers of the National Hockey League (NHL). He was drafted 19th overall by the Rangers in the 2020 NHL Entry Draft.

Playing career
Schneider finished his 2019–20 season for the Brandon Wheat Kings with 35 assists and 42 points. Schneider was drafted 19th overall by the New York Rangers in the 2020 NHL Entry Draft. Because of the COVID-19 pandemic causing the Western Hockey League (WHL) to be on hold, Schneider began play in 2021 with the Rangers' American Hockey League (AHL) partner, the Hartford Wolf Pack, on an amateur tryout that would allow him to return to the Wheat Kings. He made his professional debut with the Wolf Pack, totaling two appearances for one assist before he was returned to junior on February 13, 2021. On March 4, Schneider was signed to a three-year, entry-level contract by the Rangers.

Schneider made his NHL debut against the San Jose Sharks on January 13, 2022. He scored his first NHL goal in the same game, becoming the seventh Rangers defenceman to score a goal in his NHL debut.

International play

 

He played for Canada under-18 team at the 2019 IIHF World U18 Championships and won a gold medal at the 2018 Hlinka Gretzky Cup. 

Schneider played for Canada junior team at the 2021 World Junior Ice Hockey Championships. He was suspended one game during the tournament for his hit on German player Jan-Luca Schumacher in Canada's 16–2 win. In the tournament Schneider posted three points in six games for Canada and the team won silver medals.

Career statistics

Regular season and playoffs

International

References

External links
 

2001 births
Living people
Brandon Wheat Kings players
Canadian ice hockey defencemen
Hartford Wolf Pack players
Ice hockey people from Saskatchewan
National Hockey League first-round draft picks
New York Rangers draft picks
New York Rangers players
Sportspeople from Prince Albert, Saskatchewan